Indian Lake (Private Lake only to land owners within the borough) is a borough in Somerset County, Pennsylvania, United States. It is part of the Johnstown, Pennsylvania Metropolitan Statistical Area. The population was 391 at the 2020 census, down from 394 in 2010.  Indian Lake is home to Indian Lake Golf Club, which opened in 1974, and was the first to be designed by Arnold Palmer, Northwinds Golf Course (public), Indian Lake Resort (fine dining, banquet, and lodging), Indian Lake Marina, and the James W. McIntyre Hiking and Biking Trail.

While the crash of United Airlines Flight 93 is often reported as Shanksville, it is actually a bit closer to Indian Lake, approximately 1.5 vis-a-vis two miles away. The actual location of the crash was in a field in Stonycreek Township.

Geography
Indian Lake is located at  (40.047616, -78.859198).

Indian Lake has the fourth-highest elevation of towns in Pennsylvania, at 2281 feet.  This is the Lake water level, homes at Indian Lake range from 2300 to 2550 feet in base elevation.

Demographics

As of the census of 2000, there were 450 people, 206 households, and 146 families residing in the borough. The population density was 122.0 people per square mile (47.1/km2). There were 548 housing units at an average density of 148.5 per square mile (57.3/km2). The racial makeup of the borough was 99.33% White, 0.22% from other races, and 0.44% from two or more races. Hispanic or Latino of any race were 0.44% of the population.

In 2000 there were 206 households, of which 16.5% had children under the age of 18 living with them, 66.0% were married couples living together, 1.9% had a female householder with no husband present, and 29.1% were non-families. 22.3% of all households were made up of individuals, and 9.7% had someone living alone who was 65 years of age or older. The average household size was 2.18 and the average family size was 2.53.

In the borough the population has 14.2% under the age of 18, 4.4% from 18 to 24, 27.3% from 25 to 44, 34.7% from 45 to 64, and 19.3% who were 65 years of age or older. The median age was 47 years. For every 100 females there were 110.3 males. For every 100 females aged 18 and over, there were 113.3 males.

The median income for a household in the borough was $53,750, and the median income for a family was $58,214. Males had a median income of $44,792 versus $28,750 for females. The per capita income for the borough was $27,630. About 1.4% of families and 2.9% of the population were below the poverty line, including none of those under age 18 and 2.8% of those age 65 or over.

References

Boroughs in Somerset County, Pennsylvania
Populated places established in 1974
1974 establishments in Pennsylvania